Pachygonidia martini is a moth of the family Sphingidae.

Distribution 
It is known from Central America and South America. It has been recorded as far south as Bolivia and Peru.

Description 
It is similar to Pachygonidia hopfferi, but the forewing outer edge is rounded and the outer edge of the dark postmedian band is wavy or toothed.

Biology 
There are probably multiple generations per year.

The larvae probably feed on  Doliocarpus dentatus, Doliocarpus multiflorus and Tetracera hydrophila.

References

Pachygonidia
Moths described in 1943